Micki Nielsen (born 26 February 1993) is a Danish professional boxer. He challenged for the European cruiserweight title in 2019 and held the WBC Youth and WBC International cruiserweight titles between 2014 and 2016. He is the younger brother of Patrick Nielsen, who is also a professional boxer.

Professional boxing record

|style="text-align:center;" colspan="9"|26 fights, 25 wins (15 knockouts), 1 losses, 0 draw
|-style="text-align:center; background:#e3e3e3;"
|style="border-style:none none solid solid; "|
|style="border-style:none none solid solid; "|Result
|style="border-style:none none solid solid; "|Record
|style="border-style:none none solid solid; "|Opponent
|style="border-style:none none solid solid; "|Type
|style="border-style:none none solid solid; "|Round, time
|style="border-style:none none solid solid; "|Date
|style="border-style:none none solid solid; "|Location
|style="border-style:none none solid solid; "|Notes
|-align=center
|26
|Win
|25–1
|align=left| Ricards Bolotniks
|SD 
|8 
|27 Jan 2018
|align=left|
|align=left|
|-align=center
|25
|Win
|24–1
|align=left| Taras Oleksiyenko
|KO
|7 (8) 
|27 Oct 2017
|align=left|
|align=left|
|-align=center
|24
|Win
|23–1
|align=left| Simon Bakalak
|UD 
|8 
|8 Jul  2017
|align=left|
|align=left|
|-align=center
|23
|Loss
|22–1
|align=left| Kevin Lerena
|MD
|10
|22 Oct 2016
|align=left|
|align=left|
|-align=center
|-align=center
|22
|Win
|22–0
|align=left| Johnny Muller
|UD
|10
|11 Jun 2016
|align=left|
|align=left|
|-align=center
|21
|Win
|21–0
|align=left| Mirko Larghetti
|UD
|12
|19 Mar 2016
|align=left|
|align=left|
|-align=center
|20
|Win
|20–0
|align=left| Konstantin Semerdjiev
|KO 
|3 (8), 2:51
|12 Dec 2015
|align=left|
|align=left|
|-align=center
|19
|Win
|19–0
|align=left| Alejandro Emilio Valori
|KO 
|4 (10), 2:45
|12 Sep 2015
|align=left|
|align=left|
|-align=center
|18
|Win
|18–0
|align=left| Ismail Abdoul
|UD
|8
|20 Jun 2015
|align=left|
|align=left|
|-align=center
|17
|Win
|17–0
|align=left| Julio Cesar Dos Santos
|UD
|10
|07 Feb 2015
|align=left|
|align=left|
|-align=center
|16
|Win
|16–0
|align=left| Gusmyr Perdomo
|UD
|10
|13 Dec 2014
|align=left|
|align=left|
|-align=center
|15
|Win
|15–0
|align=left| Tamas Bajzath
|KO
|2 (8), 1:52
|13 Dec 2014
|align=left|
|align=left|
|-align=center
|14
|Win
|14–0
|align=left| Igor Pylypenko
|TKO
|3 (8), 0:30
|01 Jun 2014
|align=left|
|align=left|
|-align=center
|13
|Win
|13–0
|align=left| Gogita Gorgiladze
|UD
|10
|15 Feb 2014
|align=left|
|align=left|
|-align=center

References

External links
 

Living people
1993 births
Danish male boxers
Cruiserweight boxers
Sportspeople from Copenhagen
Southpaw boxers